Lim Ho (born April 25, 1979) is a South Korean football player who recently played for Korea National League side Goyang Kookmin Bank.

Football career
Lim started his football career with K-League side Chunnam Dragons. He did not play in league match for 2 years in Chunnam. Soon, He joined Police FC for military duty. Ending of military duty, he joined Gangneung City FC in National League. From 2005, he move again to K-League side Daegu FC as a defender. But 1 season later, he return to Gangneung that year, he awarded top scorer with 14 goals. He went through Amateur level Gumi Siltron and joined Korea National League side Goyang Kookmin Bank from 2009 season.

Honours

Club
Gangneung City
 Korea National League Runner-up (1) : 2004

Individual
Gangneung City
 Korea National League Top scorer (1) : 2007 (14 goals)
 Korea National League Best Eleven (FW) : 2007

Club career statistics

References

External links
 
 N-League Player Record - 임호 

1979 births
Living people
Association football forwards
South Korean footballers
Jeonnam Dragons players
Daegu FC players
K League 1 players
Korea National League players
People from Gumi, North Gyeongsang